Jonathan Roumie (born July 1, 1974) is an American actor best known for his role as Jesus in The Chosen, a crowd-funded television series about the life and ministry of Jesus of Nazareth. He is also a voice artist.

Early life 
Roumie was born on July 1, 1974 in New York City where he was also raised. His father is Egyptian, his paternal grandfather was born in Syria, and his mother is Irish. Roumie is a practicing Catholic; while he was baptized in the Greek Orthodox Church, Roumie converted to Catholicism after moving from New York to its suburbs. He holds a degree in film from the School of Visual Arts.

Career 

Roumie has appeared in television shows such as The Good Wife, As the World Turns, and Castle. He is known for his portrayal of Jesus in The Chosen. He played the character of Christ for the first time in a touring multi-media project about the life of St. Faustina called Faustina: Messenger of Divine Mercy and subsequently in 'Once we were Slaves/The Two Thieves'. Roumie is also the co-producer, co-director and lead actor of The Last Days: The Passion and Death of Jesus, a live performance about the passion of Christ.

His voice-over work includes the video games Evolve, Mafia II & III, and The Darkness II. Roumie has voiced several characters in the MTV series Celebrity Deathmatch.

Roumie started as a production assistant and was the location scout for Spider Man, National Treasure and I Am Legend. His first original song, "Outta Time", was released in Europe for the album Unbreakable, which he co-produced.

Formerly, he was involved in an entertainment fellowship for Christian entertainment professionals.

Personal life 
Roumie has been a ministry leader and has served as an extraordinary minister of Holy Communion within the Catholic Church. He is a strong advocate of the sacraments, ecumenism, humility and charity.  He serves on the board of Catholics in Media associates.  In 2020, he was nominated for a Papal knighthood, the Order of St. Gregory the Great. He was also named one of Aletia's "10 Catholics who restored our faith in humanity" in 2021 and made it onto Our Sunday Visitor's list of Catholics of the Year in 2022. He lives in Los Angeles. He is pro-life.

The Chosen 

Roumie's portrayal of Jesus Christ in The Chosen has been reviewed in the National Catholic Register, America Magazine,The Atlantic, and The Irish Times.

Awards

Filmography

Television

Film

Video game

Theatre

References

External links 
 Official Website
 

1974 births
American male television actors
Male actors from New York City
Male actors from Hollywood, Los Angeles
American male voice actors
American male film actors
Living people
21st-century American male actors
American people of Irish descent
American people of Egyptian descent
School of Visual Arts alumni
Converts to Roman Catholicism from Eastern Orthodoxy
21st-century Roman Catholics